This is a list of the main career statistics of Chilean professional tennis player Fernando González.

Significant finals

Grand Slam finals

Singles: 1 (0–1)

Olympic finals

Singles: 2 (1 silver, 1 bronze medal)

Doubles: 1 (1 gold medal)

Masters Series finals

Singles: 2 (0–2)

Career finals

Singles: 22 (11–11)

Other wins

Doubles: 4 (3–1)

Team competition wins

Performance timeline

Singles performance timeline

Doubles performance timeline

1Held as Hamburg Masters till 2008. Held as Madrid Masters 2009–2012.
2Held as Stuttgart Masters till 2001, Madrid Masters from 2002–2008, and Shanghai Masters 2009–2012.

Top 10 wins

González, Fernando